Magnús Ingi Helgason (born 5 April 1980) is an Icelandic badminton player.

Achievements

BWF International Challenge/Series 
Men's doubles

  BWF International Challenge tournament
  BWF International Series tournament
  BWF Future Series tournament

References

External links 
 

Living people
1980 births
Icelandic male badminton players